Candace Marie "Candy" Csencsits (née Pitts; December 29, 1955 – January 11, 1989) was a professional female bodybuilder and actress in the early 1980s.

Biography
Born Candace Marie Pitts in Northampton County, Pennsylvania, to Theodore and Helen Pitts, she became interested in bodybuilding during college while majoring in physical education. She placed 5th in her first show and after competing in several shows she achieved professional status. As a professional bodybuilder and spokesperson for the sport, she became a pioneer in drug testing for women bodybuilders, served as a judge for the IFBB and was a president of the American Federation of Women's Body Building. 

She was also an actress. In 1984, she had a role in a TV movie about bodybuilding called Getting Physical. In the 80s she competed against the likes of Rachel McLish, Carla Dunlap, and Cory Everson. She placed second in the 1982 Pro World Championship. She also finished in the top ten in the Ms. Olympia contest in 1981 and 1982.  She was at her competitive peak in 1983, when she was runner-up to Dunlap for Ms. Olympia.

Death
In 1984 after competing in the 1984 Ms. Olympia, Csencsits was diagnosed with breast cancer. This put an end to her competitive career. She continued to promote the sport while undergoing treatment. She lost her three-year battle on January 11, 1989, at her home in Tulsa County, Oklahoma, aged 33. She was buried in Saint Peter's Cemetery in Hokendauqua, Pennsylvania.

Competition history
1981 IFBB Ms. Olympia - 6th
1981 World Grand Prix - 5th
1982 IFBB Ms. Olympia - 7th
1982 IFBB Pro World Championship - 2nd
1983 IFBB Ms. Olympia - 2nd
1983 IFBB Pro World Championship - 5th
1984 IFBB Ms. Olympia - 12th

Filmography as actress
Getting Physical (1984; TV) - Janine Daley

References

External links
Muscle Memory of Candy Csencsits

1955 births
1989 deaths
American female bodybuilders
Deaths from breast cancer
Deaths from cancer in Oklahoma
Professional bodybuilders
Sportspeople from Northampton County, Pennsylvania
20th-century American women
20th-century American people